The following is a timeline of the history of the city of Montpellier, France.

Prior to 19th century

 737 - Charles Martel destroyed Maguelonne.
 986 - Lords of Montpellier begin with William I of Montpellier
 10th C. Town consisted of two portions, Montpellier and Montpelliéret.
 1160 - Law school active.
 1204 -  issued.
 1220 - University of Montpellier established.
 1293 - Philip IV of France buys part of Montpellieret
 1349 - Philip VI of France buys other part of Montpellieret.
 1364 - Monastery of Saint-Benoît founded.
 1394 - Jews expelled.
 1536 - Catholic Diocese of Maguelonne renamed Diocese of Montpellier & Montpellier Cathedral status elevated.
 1567 - Montpellier taken by Protestants.
 1593 - Jardin des plantes de Montpellier (historic botanical garden and arboretum) established.
 1622 - Siege of Montpellier.
 1624 - Citadel of Montpellier built.
 1628 - City walls demolished.
 1641 - Sainte-Ursule convent founded.
 1693 - Porte du Peyrou built.
 1704 -  founded.
 1706 -  established.
 1755 - Place de la Comédie first mentioned.
 1766 - Birth of François-Xavier Fabre, painter.
 1789 - Population: 29,500.
 1790 - Montpellier becomes part of the Hérault souveraineté.
 1793 - Population: 32,897.

19th century
 1816 - City hall moves to the 
 1819 - Bibliothèque Montpellier opens.
 1825 - Musée Fabre opens.
 1833 - Société Archéologique de Montpellier founded.
 1837 -  confectionery in production.
 1845 - Gare de Montpellier-Saint-Roch opens.
 1861 - Population: 51,865.
 1876 - Petit Méridional newspaper begins publication.
 1888 - Opéra Comédie (opera hall) (fr) opens.
 1891 -  built.
 1896 - Population: 73,950.

20th century

 1911 - Population: 80,230.
 1923 - Parc des Sports de l'avenue Pont Juvénal opens.
 1928 - Yves-du-Manoir Stadium opens.
 1930 - Sabathé Stadium opens.
 1946 - Montpellier–Méditerranée Airport opens.
 1954 - Population: 97,501.
 1962 - Population: 118,864.
 1965 -  created.
 1967 - Richter Stadium opens.
 1968 - Population: 161,910.
 1975 - Population: 191,354.
 1977 - Georges Frêche becomes mayor.
 1981 -  begins.
 1982 - Bulletin historique de la Ville de Montpellier in publication.
 1985
  created.
 Music Festival de Radio France et Montpellier begins.
 1986 - Montpellier Hérault Rugby founded.
 1988 -  headquartered in the Hôtel de Région in Montpellier.(fr)
 1999 - Population: 225,392.
 2000 - Montpellier tramway begins operating.

21st century

 2001 - Montpellier Agglomération and Orchestre national de Montpellier Languedoc-Roussillon established.
 2004 - Hélène Mandroux becomes mayor.
 2007
 Vélomagg bikeshare (fr) begins operating.
 La Serre Amazonienne (greenhouse) opens.
 2009 - En Traits Libres art space opens.
 2010 - Agora dance center established.
 2011
  built.
 Population: 264,538.
 2013 - 29 May: First official same-sex marriage in France takes place.
 2014
 March:  held.
 Philippe Saurel becomes mayor.
 2015
 December:  held.
 Montpellier Méditerranée Métropole created.
 2016 - Montpellier becomes part of the Occitanie region.

See also
 Montpellier history
 
 
 List of Catholic bishops of Montpellier
 
  region

Other cities in the Occitanie region:
 Timeline of Nimes
 Timeline of Perpignan
 Timeline of Toulouse

References 

This article incorporates information from the French Wikipedia.

Bibliography

 
 
 
 
 
  (Montpellier in 1768)

in French
 Chronicle of Montpellier (pre-1364 history of Montpellier)
 
 
 
 
  1875-1882

External links

 Items related to Montpellier, various dates (via Europeana).
 Items related to Montpellier, various dates (via Digital Public Library of America).

Montpellier
montpellier
montpellier